Gitte Haenen (born 23 March 1986) is a Belgian Paralympic athlete who competes in 100 metres and long jump events in international level events. She is also a former paratriathlete and Thai boxer competing in an elite level.

In 2010, Haenen was involved in an accident in a Thai boxing training session. She was accidentally kicked in the left knee which tore her anterior cruciate ligament and had to have many operations and rehabilitation, however in 2014, her left knee worsened and Haenen suffered with chronic pain and nerve damage and was prescribed morphine for her injury. She was forced to give up boxing and her left leg was amputated above the knee in March 2016.

References

External links 
 

1986 births
Living people
Sportspeople from Ghent
Paralympic athletes of Belgium
Belgian female sprinters
Belgian female long jumpers
Belgian amputees
Athletes (track and field) at the 2020 Summer Paralympics
Medalists at the World Para Athletics Championships
Medalists at the World Para Athletics European Championships